Maria Cristina Finucci (born 1956) is an artist, architect and designer based in Rome. She is the founder of the Garbage Patch State.

Biography
Finucci is married to the current Ambassador of Italy to the Holy See, Pietro Sebastiani. The couple has four children and four grandchildren.

She attended the University of Florence graduating magna cum laude, writing her thesis about Charles Rennie Mackintosh.

During her career as an architect, she has lived and worked in Moscow, New York, Paris, Brussels, and Madrid. Her projects have been published in various magazines and books. Her furniture designs have been exhibited at the Salone del Mobile in Milan. She has collaborated as a foreign correspondent to the architecture magazine Controspazio.

Her artistic research, started at a very young age, has encompassed painting, sculpture, architecture, design, video art, and film post-production. In 2010, her work was featured in a solo exhibition titled Paradigms at the Lu.CCA Museum.

The Garbage Patch State project

In 2013 she began her monumental artistic cycle named Wasteland, a transmedia project confronting the problem of the huge islands of plastic garbage spread through the oceans, such as the Pacific Trash Vortex. The idea was to make this "territory" into a federal state. "Since the Garbage Patch keeps on being ignored by public opinion mainly because it is not visible, I came up with the idea of creating a State out of these islands completely formed by plastic wastes whose surface amounts to around sixteen million square kilometers" stated the artist.

On 11 April 2013, with the General Director and other UNESCO authorities, Maria Cristina Finucci planted the flag of her new State and gave the inauguration speech of the Garbage Patch State. It marked the official beginning of the Wasteland cycle.

During the Venice Biennale of 2013, the Garbage Patch State, like the majority of other states, had its own pavilion in the yard of the Ca’ Foscari University. Thousands of colored plastic cups climbed over the walls surrounding the ancient building as if they were going to reach the lagoon.

In 2014 the Garbage Patch State went to Madrid for ARCO, the international art fair, with a public installation on Gran Vía. This work consisted of a "sheet" made out of plastic bottles containing flower sprouts, that at night lit up with camera flashes.

For the first National day of the Garbage Patch State, the artist inaugurated the first Embassy in the MAXXI Museum of Rome. She also realized a new installation consisting of a long plastic "wave" composed of thousands of fragments of recycled plastic bottles.

From September to October 2014 the Garbage Patch State was hosted in the UN headquarters in New York.

Among the collateral events of Milan EXPO 2015, the artist created a new installation "The Vortex", commissioned by Bracco Foundation. The Vortex is now part of the permanent collection of the Bracco Foundation.

In the same year, the hall of the High Level Conference Bluemed for climate in Venice hosted a mysterious animal formed by plastic wastes from the oceans, the Bluemedsaurus.

Crawling through the masses of wastes of the world, the plastic snake reached Paris to show itself to the heads of states present for the Climate Conference COP 21.

The Wasteland cycle continues on the island of Mozia (Trapani), with a monumental installation consisting of five millions of plastic cups contained in metallic cages. The structure, seen from above, forms the word HELP.

In June 2018, for World Oceans Day, Maria Cristina Finucci launched her latest work: a new HELP sign appeared in the Forum, Rome, as a sign of alarm to the millions of tourists visiting this famous archeological place.

Publications

Books

Articles
 [2003] "Fra architettura e scenografia. Allestimenti di Massimo Quendolo", Controspazio, n. 106;
 [2001] "Poesie e virtuosismo", Controspazio, n. 2, pp. 70–75
 [2000] "Xenia Pompeiana. Intervista a Luciano Cupelloni e Stefano De Caro", Controspazio, n. 4;
 [2000] "Nel cuore del tempo. Intervista a Giancarlo Barbato", Controspazio, n. 1;
 [1998] "Chiarezza e semplicita: lo studio Pagnamenta e Torriani a New York", Controspazio, n.1;
 [1997] "Renzo Piano per l'Atelier Brancusi", Controspazio, n.2; 
 [1995] "Negozio Banana Republic", Controspazio, n. 4;
 [1994] "A colloquio con Giovanni Pasanella", Controspazio, n. 6;

Awards and honors
 Marisa Bellisario Prize - Lifetime Achievement Award "Golden Apple" [Premio Speciale Alla Carriera]
 International Civiltà dell’Acqua "Renzo Franzin" Award
 Award "R.O.S.A. Canova Club" XIV Edition 2018 "for results obtained without external help".
 Special prize "Anima per il sociale" 2018 
 Award from "Club UNESCO Lucca" 2018 to education to sustainable development education.
 Innovation experience award "Angi" 2018
 On February 15, 2019, Finucci received an honor from the Italian Republic for her commitment in her artistic work dedicated to the environment.

Architecture Projects
 Sloane Gardens Apartment, London
 Apartment in Isernia, Italy
 Piazza Navona Penthouse, Rome
 Apartment on Rue du Cloître-Notre-Dame, Paris
 Duplex with views, Paris
 Chalet on the Periphery, Rome
 Palazzo in Circeo, Italy
 Apartment in Metropolitan Tower, New York City
 Testaccio Apartment, Rome
 Duplex on Rue Rouelle, Paris
 Apartment near Piazza Navona, Rome
 Piazza Navona Apartment, Rome
 Strozzi Farmhouse, Chianti, Italy
 Apartment Rue Jacob, Paris
 Prati Apartment, Rome
 Quai Saint-Michel Penthouse, Paris
 Lucardo Alto House, Chianti, Italy
 Farm in Capalbio, Italy
 Agricultural Complex, Chianti, Italy
 Townhouse at Colosseo, Rome

See also
 Garbage Patch State

References

External links

 Official Website
 Vimeo | Maria Cristina Finucci - Vimeo
 The Garbage Patch State

1956 births
Living people
Italian artists
Architects from Lucca